People for Equality and Relief in Lanka (PEARL) is an organisation founded by human rights activists in 2005 in the United States after witnessing the human rights violations and suffering of the Tamil people during the Sri Lankan Civil War.The lack of accountability, political will and Sri Lankan judiciary and political system unable and unwilling to bring perpetrators to justice.The over Militarization of the traditional Tamil areas. To increase engagement between Americans and elected officials and urge the US government to play a greater role in Sri Lanka.

References

External links 
Official Website

Human rights organizations based in the United States
Imprisonment and detention
Organizations established in 2005
Human rights in Sri Lanka